Bopfingen (Swabian: Bopfeng) is a small city in Baden-Württemberg, Germany. It is situated in the Ostalbkreis, between Aalen and Nördlingen. It consists of the city Bopfingen itself and its suburbs Aufhausen, Baldern, Flochberg, Kerkingen, Oberdorf, Schloßberg, Trochtelfingen, and Unterriffingen.
Bopfingen is famous for its landmark Ipf, a table mountain which is part of the neighboring Schwäbische Alb to the east. To the west it borders to Bavaria and the meteor crater Nördlinger Ries.

The first known settlers came to the area 8000 years ago in the Holocene. Also Celtic and Roman relics were found. It was first mentioned between 775-850 AD in a deed of foundation of "Traditiones Fuldenses" where it was called "Pophingen".

Mayors
Since February  2006 Gunter Bühler is the mayor of Bopfingen. Bühler is an economic geographer. 
Previous mayors:
 Wilhelm Haas: 1840-1876
 Wilhelm Dörr 1877-1899
 Adolf Bergmüller: 1900-1903
 Eugen Enslin: 1903-1936
 Hans Ellinger: 1936-1945 
 Paul Merz: 1945-1947 
 Hans Ellinger: 1954-1973
 Erich Göttlicher: 1973-1998
 Bernhard Rapp: 1998-2006

Sons and daughters of the city 

 Wilhelm Meyder (1841-1927), born in Oberdorf am Ipf, Schultheiss (mayor) and Member of Landtag
 Heinrich Hiesinger (born 1960), industrial manager, since January 21, 2011 Chairman of the Management Board of  ThyssenKrupp AG

References

 Bopfingen, Landschaft-Geschichte-Kultur. Theiss, 1992.

Towns in Baden-Württemberg
Ostalbkreis
Free imperial cities